A list of American films released in 1985.

Out of Africa won the Academy Award for Best Picture.
The highest-grossing film of 1985 was Back to the Future.



A

B

C-G

H-M

N-S

T-Z

See also
 1985 in American television
 1985 in the United States

External links

 
 List of 1985 box office number-one films in the United States

1985
Films
Lists of 1985 films by country or language